Trypanaresta difficilis is a species of tephritid or fruit flies in the genus Trypanaresta of the family Tephritidae.

Distribution
Argentina.

References

Tephritinae
Insects described in 1933
Diptera of South America